The Rhine–Lafayette Pedestrian Overpass is a pedestrian bridge near TriMet's Southeast 17th Avenue and Rhine Street station in southeast Portland, Oregon. It opened in September 2015, replacing a bridge which had spanned the Union Pacific Railroad tracks since 1943. Worked on the bridge began in 2014, and the span was lifted into place in December. Elevator improvements were completed in 2018. Along These Lines is installed at one end.

References

External links

 

2015 establishments in Oregon
Bridges completed in 2015
Bridges in Portland, Oregon
Brooklyn, Portland, Oregon
Pedestrian bridges in Oregon
TriMet